Iracelma Patrícia da Silva (born 1 February 1991) is an Angolan handball player for Primeiro de Agosto and the Angolan national team.

She represented Angola at the 2013 World Women's Handball Championship in Serbia.

Achievements 
Carpathian Trophy:
Winner: 2019

References

Angolan female handball players
1991 births
Living people
Competitors at the 2019 African Games
Handball players from Luanda
African Games competitors for Angola
African Games medalists in handball
African Games gold medalists for Angola